Captain House is an Indian comedy drama series created and co-produced by Ekta Kapoor and Shobha Kapoor under their banner Balaji Telefilms. The series premiered in 1995 on DD Metro.

Plot
The series is a horror comedy that revolves around a haunted house with an element of fantasy in it. The story revolves around a young widow and her two little children who come to live in the house.

Cast
 Kanwaljeet Singh/Narendra Jha
 Vaidehi Amrute
 Seema Deshmukh
 Tanvi Hegde
 Lekha Govil
 Shehzad Khan

References

External links 
 
 Official Website

Balaji Telefilms television series
DD Metro original programming
Indian television soap operas
1995 Indian television series debuts
1995 Indian television series endings